

Storms
Note:  indicates the name was retired after that usage in the respective basin

Gabekile (2020) – did not impact land

Gabrielle
 1982 – a moderate tropical storm that brushed the islands of Mauritius and Réunion without causing damage. 
  1989 – reached Category 4 and, though never striking land, caused large ocean swells on the East Coast of the United States that killed eight.
 1995 – strengthened rapidly but formed too close to land to reach hurricane strength before making landfall in Mexico, causing minimal damage.
 2001 – made landfall near Venice, Florida as a tropical storm, exited back into the ocean and strengthened into a minimal hurricane, degenerating south of Newfoundland.
 2007 – subtropical storm that became a weak tropical storm prior to making landfall on the Outer Banks of North Carolina, causing light damage.
 2009 – downgraded to a tropical low in post-analysis, did not affect land.
 2013 – short-lived, weak tropical storm that formed and dissipated in the Caribbean Sea south of Puerto Rico, but reformed close to Bermuda.
 2019 – weak and disorganized tropical storm that dissipated over the eastern Atlantic, but later regenerated and intensified into a moderate tropical storm.
 2023 – a category 3 tropical cyclone which crossed to the South Pacific basin and severely affected Norfolk Island and New Zealand as a subtropical system.

 Gading
 1966 – struck the Philippines and southern China as a relatively strong tropical storm.
 1970 – a system that was considered by JMA as a tropical depression and by JTWC as a tropical storm; hit Taiwan and southeastern China.
 1974 – a tropical storm which did not affect land.
 1978 – a minimal tropical depression which affected Taiwan.
 1982 – another short-lived tropical depression that was only tracked by PAGASA.
 1986 – the strongest tropical cyclone in 1986 and one of the most intense typhoons recorded; struck the Philippines and China causing widespread destruction, killing 422.
 1990 – relatively strong typhoon which made landfall the Philippines, Taiwan and mainland China, claiming at least 284 lives.
 1994 – a tropical storm that produced flooding in the Philippines and China together with Severe Tropical Storm Russ, causing at least 13 fatalities but reportedly killing as many as 1,400 people.
 1998 – a fairly strong typhoon which had a northeastward track and struck the Philippines and Japan, killing a total of 108 people, mostly from the capsizing of the MV Princess of the Orient.

Gaemi
 2012 – became Depression BOB 01, the first storm of the 2012 North Indian Ocean cyclone season.
 2018 – a weak tropical storm that caused minor damage to Taiwan.

Gamma
 2005 – a late season tropical storm that produced locally heavy rainfall and flooding in Honduras and Belize.
 2020 – a Category 1 hurricane that brought heavy rains, floods, and landslides to the Yucatán Peninsula.

 Garding
 1978 – a relatively long-lived late-season tropical depression that was monitored by JMA, JTWC and PAGASA.
 1994 – a strong late-season typhoon which affected central Philippines, claiming at least 19 lives.

Gardo
 2018 – a Category 5 super typhoon which weakened before making landfall in East China.
 2022 – a tropical depression that formed over the Philippine Sea and was absorbed by the circulation around Typhoon Hinnamnor.

Gaston
2004 – made landfall in South Carolina; originally designated a tropical storm
2010 – short-lived tropical storm that dissipated before reaching land.
2016 – Category 3 hurricane, did not affect land
2022 – formed in the middle of the ocean without affecting land.

Gay
 1965 – did not make landfall.
 1981 – a Category 2 typhoon that weakened to a Category 1 before brushing the eastern coast of Japan.
 1985 – a Category 3 typhoon that remained well off the coast of Japan.
 1988 – a minimal tropical storm that stayed well out to sea.
 1989 – a severe tropical cyclone that struck Thailand then crossed into the Indian Ocean Basin becoming a Category 5 tropical cyclone before striking India
 1992 – long-lived Category 5 super typhoon storm that affected the Marshall Islands and struck Guam

Gaja (2018) – was the sixth named cyclone of the 2018 North Indian Ocean cyclone season.

Gati (2020) – was the strongest tropical cyclone on record to make landfall in Somalia, and one of few tropical cyclones to do so in the country. 

Gafilo (2004) – was both the most intense tropical cyclone ever recorded in the South-West Indian Ocean and the most intense tropical cyclone worldwide in 2004.

Geralda (1994) – a powerful tropical cyclone that caused catastrophic damage in Madagascar in late January 1994, among the strongest to hit the country.

Gene
1990 - hit Japan
1992 - no threat to land.
1993 - did not affect land.
2008 - caused extensive practice to Fiji and Vanuatu.

Gener
 2004 – a strong tropical storm that produced deadly flooding in Vietnam and Thailand.Philippines and China.
 2008 – a tropical depression that was only recognized by PAGASA.
 2012 – a strong tropical cyclone affecting the Philippines, Taiwan and China.
 2016 – a powerful tropical cyclone which affected Taiwan and Japan in mid September 2016. 
 2020 – churned in the open ocean.

Genevieve
 1970 – a strong tropical cyclone affected Madagascar.
 1984 - a category 3 hurricane that passed offshore Mexico and dissipated near the southern tip of the Baja California Peninsula.
 1990 - a category 2 hurricane, no effect on land.
 1996 - long-lived tropical storm, no effect on land.
 2002 - strong tropical storm, no effect on land.
 2008 - minimal Category 1, no effect on land.
 2014 - a long-lasting tropical cyclone crossing all three North Pacific basins.
 2020 - a powerful Category 4 hurricane that affected the southern tip of the Baja California Peninsula.

Gelena (2019) – was the second storm to affect the island of Rodrigues, damage on the island were about US$1 million.

George
1947 – a long-lived and an intense tropical cyclone that affected the Bahamas, southernmost Florida, and the Gulf Coast of the United States in September 1947.
1950 – developed southeast of Bermuda, intensified to Category 2 hurricane and became extratropical south of Newfoundland
1951 – struck Bay of Campeche and made landfall in Tampico, Mexico
2007 – developed in the Joseph Bonaparte Gulf, intensified to a Category 5 severe tropical cyclone (Australian scale) and hit the Pilbara coast.

Georges
1980 – Category 1 hurricane, remained in the open Atlantic
1998  – Category 4 hurricane, caused severe destruction as it traversed the Caribbean Sea and Gulf of Mexico

Georgette
1967 – never affected land.
1971 – remained over the open ocean.
1975 – had no impact on land.
1980 – Category 1 hurricane, did not affect land.
1986a – crossed from the Central Pacific basin into the Western Pacific basin and degraded into a tropical wave.
1986b – remnants of the earlier Georgette regenerated into a severe tropical storm.
1992 – Category 2 hurricane, did not affect land.
1998 – Category 3 hurricane, did not affect land.
2004 – remained over the open ocean
2010 – struck Baja California Sur.
2016 – Category 4 hurricane, did not affect land.
2022 – did not affect land.

Gert
 1981 - caused heavy rainfall to several islands in the Caribbean but no significant damage.
 1993 - formed near and later made landfall in Central America and then twice in Mexico, before existing the basin and moved to the eastern Pacific basin where it later dissipated.
 1999 - reached Category 4 strength, threatened Bermuda before turning away.
 2005 - made landfall near Tampico, Mexico.
 2011 - formed in the open ocean, passed close to Bermuda, brushing the island with light rainfall. 
 2017 - a Category 2 hurricane that did not cause any impact on land.

Gil
 1983 – the first of several tropical cyclones to affect Hawaii during the 1983.
 1989 – a Category 1 hurricane paralleled the coast of Mexico.
 1995 – remained over the open ocean.
 1998 – a weak tropical storm, made landfall in Thailand as a tropical depression which caused a plane crash at Surat Thani.
 2001 – remained over the open ocean.
 2007 – had caused squally weather off the eastern coast of Mexico.
 2013 – remained over the open ocean.
 2019 – remained over the open ocean.

Gilda
 1952 – weak tropical storm that struck China.
 1954 – strong tropical storm that caused 29 deaths in Honduras before striking Belize.
 1956 – attained super typhoon status and made landfall on Taiwan.
 1959 – super typhoon which moved across central Philippines, causing 23 deaths and leaving 60,000 homeless.
 1962 – remained over open waters before becoming extratropical east of Japan.
 1965 – formed well east of the Philippines, weakens, and later becomes a strong tropical storm before moving ashore and dissipating over China.
 1967 – super typhoon which eventually strikes Taiwan as a minimal typhoon
 1971 – formed over the Philippines and dissipates over China.
 1973 – first tropical cyclone on record to transition into a subtropical cyclone; caused six deaths in Jamaica and minor damage in Cuba, the Bahamas, and Florida.
 1974 – brought heavy rainfall to South Korea and Japan, causing 128 deaths and $1.5 billion in damage.
 1977 (February) – remained over open waters.
 1977 (October) – remained over open waters, passing to the east of Japan.

Gilma
 1978 – a Category 3 hurricane.
 1982 – a Category 3 hurricane, which passed south of Hawaii.
 1988 – a tropical storm, which made landfall on Hawaii as a tropical depression.
 1994 – a Category 5 hurricane; strongest of its season.
 2000 – a Category 1 hurricane, that did not affect land.
 2006 – a weak tropical storm.
 2012 – a Category 1 hurricane that never affected land.
 2018 – a weak and short-lived tropical storm.

Gilbert (1988) – was the second most intense tropical cyclone on record in the Atlantic basin in terms of barometric pressure, only behind Hurricane Wilma in 2005.

 Gina
 1960 – late-season storm that remained out to sea.
 1962 – a weak tropical storm that bought impacts to Madagascar and Mozambique.
 1968 – remained out to sea.
 1989 – a weak storm that impacted Samoa.
 2003 – an off-season Category 3 severe tropical cyclone that affected the Solomon Islands.
 2022 – a weak off-season storm that affected Vanuatu and New Caledonia.

Ginger
1967 – an earlier storm of the same name.
 1971 – was the second longest-lasting Atlantic hurricane on record.

Ginny (1963) – was the strongest recorded tropical cyclone to make landfall in Canada, as well as the latest hurricane on a calendar year to affect the U.S. state of Maine. 

Giovanna (2012) – a powerful tropical cyclone that affected Madagascar.

Gladys
 1947 – remained over the open ocean.
 1955 – a Category 1 hurricane that hit Mexico. 
 1964 – a tropical cyclone that caused minor impact along the East Coast of the United States, Bermuda, and Atlantic Canada. 
 1968 – hit Cuba, Florida and Nova Scotia.
 1975 – the farthest tropical cyclone from the United States to be observed by radar in the Atlantic basin since Hurricane Carla in 1961. 
 1991 – Struck Japan and South Korea.
 1994 – Struck Taiwan.

Glenda
 1963 – stayed at sea. 
 1965 – remained over the open ocean.
 1967 – large waves NSW Coast extreme beach erosion.
 1969 – a  Category 1 hurricane that made its way to Baja California.
 1973 – remained over the open ocean.
 1977 – did not make landfall.
 2006 (March) – a Category 5 severe tropical cyclone that made landfall in Western Australia.
 2006 (July) – struck Taiwan and China.
 2010 
 2014 – a Category 5 super typhoon that impacted the Philippines and China.
 2015 – did not make landfall.

Gloria
 1949 – 
 1952 –
 1957 – struck the Philippines and Hong Kong.
 1960 – Japan Meteorological Agency analyzed it as a tropical depression, not as a tropical storm.
 1963 – struck Taiwan and eastern China.
 1965 – Japan Meteorological Agency analyzed it as a tropical depression, not as a tropical storm.
 1968 – 
 1971 – Japan Meteorological Agency analyzed it as a tropical depression, not as a tropical storm.
 1974 – 
 1975 – 
 1976 – remained out at sea.
 1978 – 
 1979 – a minor hurricane that stayed out to sea.
 1980 – 
 1985 – grazed North Carolina and struck Long Island and Connecticut, causing $900 million in damage and eight deaths.
 1996 – hit Taiwan and China.
 1999 – 
 2000 – 
 2002 – a deadly and destructive Category 4 super typhoon that hit Chuuk, Federated States of Micronesia.
 2020 – brought severe flooding to southern and eastern Spain, killing at least 13 people.

Goni
 2009 – a weak tropical storm made landfall South China.
 2015 – a powerful tropical cyclone that affected much of East Asia in late August 2015.
 2020 – made landfall as a Category 5–equivalent super typhoon on Catanduanes in the Philippines and in Vietnam as a tropical storm.

Gonu (2007) – was an extremely powerful tropical cyclone that became the strongest cyclone on record in the Arabian Sea.

Gonzalo
 2014 – a powerful Category 4 hurricane that made landfall in Bermuda.
 2020 – the earliest seventh named storm on record, becoming a moderate tropical storm before weakening and hitting Trinidad and Tobago as a tropical depression.
Gombe (2022) – a strong tropical cyclone that affected Mozambique.

Gordon
 1979 (January)
1979 (July) – strong tropical storm which made landfall in China.
1982 – a category 3 typhoon with no known effects on land.
1985 – a weak tropical storm which made landfall in Vietnam.
1989 – powerful Category 5 super typhoon which crossed northern Luzon at peak intensity before making landfall southwest of Hong Kong as a strong tropical storm. 306 people were killed by Gordon, and 120,000 were left homeless in the Philippines.
 1994 – killed 1,122 in Haiti, and 23 in other nations. Damage in the United States was $400 million, and damage in Haiti and Cuba was severe.
 2000 – formed near Guatemala, cut across the Yucatán Peninsula and later hit Florida as a tropical storm. Killed 23 in Guatemala and one in Florida, and $10.8 million damage there (no figure for Guatemala).
 2006 – formed in the central North Atlantic, tracked north and east while becoming a Category 3 major hurricane. Crossed the Azores as a Category 1 storm before dissipating over western Europe.
 2012 – a strong Category 2 hurricane which passed over the eastern Azores as a Category 1.
 2018 – formed near the Florida Keys and affected South Florida, killing two. Then made landfall west of the Alabama-Mississippi border as a strong tropical storm, causing moderate damage.

Goring
 1965 – brushed the northern Philippines.
 1969 – hit extreme northern Philippines.
 1973 – 
 1977 – struck the Philippines and Taiwan.
 1981 – 
 1985 – struck China.
 1989 – struck the Philippines and China.
 1993 – struck the Philippines and China.
 1997 – struck China.
 2007 – struck China.
 2011 – 
 2015 – developed in the Central Pacific Basin and made landfall over Kyushu.
 2019 – 

Gorio
 2001 –  
 2005 – struck Ryukyu Islands and China.
 2009 – struck southern China
 2013 – struck the Philippines, China, Hong Kong, and Macau.
 2017 — struck Taiwan and East China.
 2021 - formed east of Taiwan, and passed just south of Japan.

Grace
 1945 – approached Japan.
 1950 – Category 1 typhoon that made landfall in South Korea as a tropical storm.
 1954 – affected Japan.
 1958 – Category 5 super-typhoon with 190 mph winds and a pressure of 905 mbar that moved through the Ryukyu Islands and made landfall in Zhejiang.
 1961 – Japan Meteorological Agency analyzed it as a tropical depression, not as a tropical storm.
 1963 – remained out at sea.
 1964 – executed a loop before re-strengthening and eventually dissipating southeast of Japan.
 1966 – near typhoon-force storm that did not affect land.
 1969 – Category 2 typhoon, remained over the open ocean.
 1972 – took an erratic track east of Luzon.
 1975 – took an erratic track east of Luzon, eventually dissipated in the Bering Sea.
 1984 – Category 3 severe tropical cyclone that affected Queensland.
 1991 – Category 2 hurricane that passed 50 miles (80 km) south of Bermuda; its remnants contributed to the creation of a large and powerful nor'easter, nicknamed "The Perfect Storm".
 1997 – formed north of Hispaniola, threatened no land.
 2003 – made landfall in Texas.
 2005 – Category 2 cyclone that resulted in nearly 30 in. of rainfall and $20 million in damage in Australia.
 2009 – formed northeast of the Azores; its remnants moved inland over Wales. 
 2015 – no threat to land.
 2021 – formed near the Leeward Islands and rapidly intensified into a Category 3 hurricane in the Bay of Campeche, before making landfall in Veracruz.

Gracie (1959) – developed just north of Hispaniola, intensified into a Category 4 hurricane and made landfall in South Carolina

Greg
 1981  – churned in the open ocean.
 1987 – paralleled the Mexican coast while remaining far offshore.
 1993 – continuation of Atlantic Tropical Storm Brett.
 1990 – developed in the Gulf of Carpentaria.
 1996 – made landfall on northern Borneo in the Malaysian state of Sabah, causing over $280 million in damage (1996 USD) and 238 deaths.
 1999 – made landfall in Baja California Sur
 2005 – short-lived storm that remained well offshore.
 2011 – stayed out to sea.
 2017 (April) – developed north-east of the Cocos Islands.
 2017 (July) – churned in the open ocean.

Greta
 1956 - Category 2 hurricane, did not directly impact land.
 1966 - no impact on land.
 1970 - traversed the northern Yucatán Peninsula and later made landfall near Tampico, Mexico.
 1978 - Category 4 Hurricane, made landfall near Dangriga, Belize, crossed Guatemala and southeastern Mexico as a tropical depression, then re-intensified in the Eastern Pacific and was renamed Olivia.

Gretchen
 1966 – 
 1970 – 
 1974 – 

Gretel
 1985 – passed over the Cobourg Peninsula in the Northern Territory.
 2020 – developed east of Queensland and soon crossed into the South Pacific cyclone region.

Gretelle (1997) – a deadly storm that struck southeastern Madagascar in January 1997.

Guambe (2021) – was the third tropical cyclone to make landfall in the country of Mozambique since December 2020, following Cyclone Eloise and Tropical Storm Chalane.

Guchol
 2005 – 
 2012 – struck Japan.
 2017 – 

Guillermo
 1979 – 
 1985 – 
 1991 – 
 1997 – 
 2003 – 
 2009 – 
 2015 – 
 2021 – 

Guito (2014) – an area of convection over eastern Mozambique  moved into the Mozambique Channel.

Gulab (2021) – a cyclonic storm made landfall in coastal regions of Andhra Pradesh and southern Odisha, and remnants of the storm caused by devastating rainfall and landslides in Maharashtra before it regenerated as Cyclone Shaheen in Arabian Sea. 

Gustav
1984 – short-lived storm near Bermuda
1990 – Category 3 hurricane that neared the Lesser Antilles
1996
2002 – Category 2 hurricane that brushed North Carolina and later Nova Scotia and Newfoundland
2008 – strong Category 4 hurricane that caused over $6 billion in damage and 138 deaths in the Greater Antillies and the Gulf Coast region of the United States.

Gwen
 1947 – 
 1960
 1967
 1968
 1972 – Category 3 hurricane, made landfall north of San Diego, California, as a depression.
 1976 – remained over the open ocean.
 1978 – 

Gwenda (1999) – Category 5 severe tropical cyclone (Australian scale), made landfall along the Pilbara coast.

See also

Tropical cyclone
Tropical cyclone naming
European windstorm names
Atlantic hurricane season
List of Pacific hurricane seasons
South Atlantic tropical cyclone

References

General

 
 
 
 
 
 
 
 
 
 
 
 
 
 
 
 
 

 
 
 
 
 

G